Mya (stylized as Mýa) is the debut studio album by American singer Mya. It was released by University Music Entertainment and Interscope Records on April 21, 1998, in the United States. Recording of the contemporary R&B album was overseen by University Records CEO Haaq Islam after he signed the singer when she was at the age of 15. Production on Mya was primarily handled by Swing Mob member Darryl "Day" Pearson with additional contributions from Daryl Simmons, Alex "Cat" Cantrall, Joey Priolo, and Nokio the N-Tity. Guest appearances include Dru Hill frontman Sisqó, No Limit rapper Silkk the Shocker, and rapper Missy Elliott.

The album received generally favorable reviews from music critics, who complimented Mya's vocals and songwriting abilities, as well as the album's well-crafted appeal. Mya peaked at number 29 on the US Billboard 200 and was certified platinum by the Recording Industry Association of America (RIAA), selling over 1.4 million copies in the United States. The album spawned three singles; "It's All About Me" (featuring Sisqó), "Movin' On" (featuring Silkk the Shocker), and the Diane Warren/Babyface-penned ballad "My First Night with You". In the midst of the album's success, Mya earned several accolades, including a NAACP Image Award nomination and two Soul Train Music Award nominations.

Background
As a child, Mya was an accomplished, gifted dancer who had trained with Savion Glover, Gregory Hines, and the Dance Theater of Harlem. Mya's parents first took noticed of their daughter's skills when she was five years old. By then, she had developed a gift for mimicking complicated dance steps and creating complex sounds and rhythms with her feet. However, by the time she was eight, Mya was burned out. She had quit tap dance, at least partly out of frustration because she was more advanced than the available instruction could accommodate. Three years later, her passion returned when she first saw tap dancer and choreographer Savion Glover—known as the creator of the Broadway musical Bring in 'da Noise, Bring in 'da Funk—who proved to be an immediate inspiration. "He was my age, and he was featured around all these masters", Mya recalls. "And he was so natural with it." She soon joined a youth dance group called Tappers with Attitude (T.W.A.), the first place her aggressive style would be encouraged.

Mya first auditioned for Glover when she was 11 and again at 12, but did not pass muster. "The year after, I was ready", she said. Using her photographic memory, she had studied documentary footage of such masters as Gregory Hines, the Nicholas Brothers, Buster Brown, Honi Coles, and Sammy Davis Jr. Mya ended up doing a number of residencies with Glover, who gave her a solo spot in a Kennedy Center performance when she was 14. At that point, Mya had not even told her parents she wanted to sing. "It was something I held to myself, that no one could take away from me", Mya explained. "I didn't want to be pressured or forced into lessons all over again in another area, as with the dance. I wanted to develop this on my own, at my own pace." Eventually, Mya developed enough courage to sing for some dance class pals, who encouraged her to break the silence at home. "I finally told my mom, and when she told my dad—he's a singer—he said, 'Mýa can't sing! I don't believe you!' During her early-to-mid-teen years, she taught dance to kids and held a dancing gig on BET's Teen Summit as well.

At the age of 15, Mya shifted her focus solely on music, and although she was best known as a dancer, she was also musically inclined, learning how to sing and play the violin as a child. When her father—a professional musician—learned that his daughter could sing and was serious about a musical career, they began to shop around demo tapes, eventually earning the attention of University Music Entertainment president and CEO Haaq Islam. According to Mya, "her father sent demo tapes out to a few record companies, but they all said 'She's not ready.' "Some early demos were recorded in a basement studio for $20, followed by the major expenditure of $1,000 for a single. "It was difficult", Mya explained. "We didn't have that kind of money." Impressed with Mya's audition, Islam signed her to Interscope Records.

Development and recording 

Islam often referred to Mya as "his Diana Ross", commenting that "she has a vocal ability that can be heard in a room full of singers; her flow is tantamount to a rapper." After her living-room audition, there were meetings and discussions about what direction to follow, what image to pursue and what goals to set. Under Islam's guidance, Islam sought to mold Mya after American pop singers such as Madonna and Janet Jackson. He explained that his label "were going after the Madonna/Janet Jackson spot, dance and pop", while also targeting the teenage cotillion of fellow teen R&B singers Brandy, Aaliyah, and Monica. According to Islam, his idea was to put together an album "that spoke to the hurt, pains, needs and desires of today's youth—falling in love, being in love, discovering love, falling out of love, not having love, being hurt. We knew if we did that accurately, young women and people of all ages and genders would identify with it."

Mya and Interscope spent the next two years working on her debut album. Due to his rising connections within the industry, Islam was able to hire an elite team of collaborators, including Dru Hill, another  act, rapper Missy "Misdemeanor" Elliott, and musicians such as Darryl Pearson, Diane Warren and Babyface. Commenting on the album's nature, Mya elaborated that it "speaks mostly to men and that many of the songs offer variety of messages." She also noted that album is "lady-like" and done in a "tasteful" way, leaving some things to the imagination; rather than trying to sound vulgar or explicit. The singer co-wrote many of the songs on the album, including "If You Died I Wouldn't Cry Cause You Never Loved Me Anyway", where she puts a voice to the gut-wrenching pain some woman feel at the end of a relationship. In the song, Mýa sings of wanting a man to "die" because "he never loved her anyway." She said, "the song is about saying things in anger, but being able to learn from mistakes." Another ballad, "My First Night with You", is about a non-sexual experience with a man, written by Babyface and produced by Daryl Simmons. "Bye Bye", which features Elliott was written by Mýa and Pearson. Other songs included on the album were the dance-oriented "We're Goin Make Ya Dance and "What Cha Say", a song Mya wrote by herself.

Release and promotion
In April 1998, Intercope held a press release for Mya, with Billboard magazine promoting. At the time of the press release, University Music revealed and shared details regarding Mya's project and University Music's marketing strategy plan, announcing the album and US single release dates. Although Mya was initially slated for a May 5, 1998 release date, it was later changed to April 21. However, an international release date for the album was not set. Mya's first single "It's All About Me" featuring Sisqó was solicited to radio March 3 and released commercially March 10. The music video for "It's All About Me" was serviced to BET and The Box on February 10. It was serviced to MTV at a later date.

From the beginning,  and Interscope used Mya's connection to labelmates Dru Hill as a promotional tool. To create a buzz for Mya,  coupled her with Dru Hill in video and television appearances as an outlet to create a fan base for her. In addition to video and television appearances, Mya was featured on Puff Daddy's concert tour which also included Dru Hill. To continue to create an ongoing buzz for herself, she opened the boy group Boyz II Men tour from April 26 to July 26. As a marketing plan,  announced and created a grass-roots campaign that hit high schools. The label distributed newsletters about Mya hitting more than 25,000 high schools nationally. University also set up a Mya 900 number which was advertised on posters and fliers. Callers could hear samples of Mya's music and hear the latest on her activities. On the press front, Mya appeared on the cover of Right On! and Teen People magazines. In late April, Mya appeared and performed "It's All About Me" on Vibe. Lastly, she was featured on Interscope's worldwide website, where she had her own page.

Singles
Mya's debut album produced three singles. Lead single "It's All About Me", a duet with singer Sisqó, peaked at number six on Billboard Hot 100 and number two on Hot R&B/Hip-Hop Songs chart, marking Mya's first top 10 entry as a solo artist. It was later certified gold by the Recording Industry Association of America (RIAA). A moderate international success, it peaked in the top 20 on the New Zealand Singles Chart and the top 40 on the Canadian Singles Chart. A remix version of "Movin' On", featuring additional vocals from rapper Silkk the Shocker", was released as the album's second single. It reached number 11 in New Zealand, number 34 on the Billboard Hot 100, and number four on Hot R&B/Hip-Hop Songs chart. The album's third and final single, a cover of Deborah Cox's 1995 song "My First Night with You", peaked at number 28 on both the Billboard Hot 100 and the Hot R&B/Hip-Hop Songs chart.

Critical reception

Mya received generally positive reviews from music critics. AllMusic editor Stephen Thomas Erlewine called the album a "thoroughly promising debut" that compromises "a fine set of songs that manage to sound universal and strangely confessional", while describing it as "a smooth, sultry collection of well-crafted contemporary urban soul that is actually richer than the average urban record the late '90s." In his review for The Washington Post, journalist Richard Harrington wrote that Mya made "a strong first impression with her own eponymous debut."

Paul Verna of Billboard found that Mya "scored on her debut album by addressing issues of concern to women without spewing cuss words." He compared the material to R&B band Destiny's Child and complimented Mya's songwriting skills, ranking "It's All About Me", "Whatcha Say", "Bye Bye", "My First Night With You", "Movin' On", and "We're Gonna Make Ya Dance" among the album's noteworthy tracks. Ayana B. Byrd of Vibe magazine expressed that on Mya, the "Washington, D.C. native always sings with a voice that is clear, strong, and assured", adding that the album combined "round-the-way girl sass with an artist's sensibility".

Accolades
Mya and its singles earned Mya numerous nominations. In 1998, she received her first award nomination for a Soul Train Lady of Soul Award in the Best R&B/Soul or Rap New Artist category. The following year, Mya continued to score multiple award nominations. Mya earned two Soul Train Music Awards nominations for Best R&B/Soul or Rap New Artist and Best R&B/Soul Album – Female. At 1999 NAACP Image Awards, she received a nomination for Outstanding New Artist. Mya scored a New R&B/Hip-Hop Artist of the Year nomination at Billboard Music Awards. Her single, "Movin' On" earned her a second nomination at the 1999 Soul Train Lady of Soul awards for Best R&B/Soul Song of the Year. For the 1999 Source Hip-Hop Music Awards, she received a nomination for R&B Artist of the Year.

Commercial performance
Mya debuted at number 77 on the Billboard 200 on May 9, 1998. A steady seller, by May 22, 1998 in its fourth week, Mya had sold 220,000 copies. The album eventually peaked at number 29 on the Billboard 200 and at number 13 on Billboards Top R&B/Hip Hop Albums chart during the weeks of September 5 and July 14, 1998, respectively. During the holiday season of 1998, Mya experienced its biggest single-week of sales, scanning 64,858 units. It was certified platinum by the Recording Industry Association of America on October 1, 1998. In January 1999 the album was ranked as the 75th best-selling album of 1998 in the United States, selling 1.1 million copies. As of May 2003, Mya had sold over 1.4 million copies in the US. By May 18, 2001 worldwide sales for Mya stood at six million copies sold combined with sales from Fear of Flying (2000).

Legacy
With the release and success of her debut album and its singles, Mya established herself a successful solo recording artist. Right from the beginning, MTV embraced Mya and her singles "It's All About Me" and "Movin' On". Additionally, MTV heavily went into rotation on two film-related songs on which Mya was the featured vocalist, including Pras's "Ghetto Supastar" from Bulworth and Blackstreet's "Take Me There" from The Rugrats Movie. Sharing her opinion on Harrison's success, author Stacy-Deanne expressed, "With strong R&B vocals and super hip-hop tracks, Mya was labeled the new "Ghetto Princess"she was the new "it" girl." Complex magazine recognized "Movin' On" as one of the Best R&B Videos of the '90s. In a poll conducted by Billboard, "Movin' On" ranked 10th on its list of the 20 Best High School Music Videos. Actor and singer Rotimi sampled "Movin' On" for his five-track Summer Bangerz EP.  In honor its twentieth anniversary, Vibe ranked the album's tracks from worst to first and commented, "Mýa remains one of the definitive R&B albums of its era, is regarded as a certified classic and will always be remembered as the music world's introduction to its creator."
Billboard acknowledged the album track "Bye Bye" featuring Missy Elliott and ranked it at number 47 on their 50 Greatest Deep Cuts of 1998 list.

Track listing

Sample credits
 "Keep On Lovin' Me" samples "I Did It for Love" by Love Unlimited.
 "It's All About Me" contains an interpolation of "Moments in Love" by Art of Noise.

Personnel
Credits adapted from the liner notes of Mya.

Performers and musicians

Mya – background vocals
Dru Hill – background vocals
Joey P. – acoustic guitar, bass guitar, electric guitar, strings
Randy Bowland – guitar
Ronnie Garrett – bass
Daryl Simmons – drum programming, keyboard programming
Silkk the Shocker – performer

Technical

A. Haqq Islam – executive production
Daven Baptiste – artwork, design
Darryl Pearson – production, vocal arrangement
Eldren Hughes – artwork, design
Fred – mixing assistance
Gordon Rice – engineering
Ivy Skoff – production coordination
Jason Webb – engineering assistance, mixing assistance
Kevin Lively – engineering assistance

Charts

Weekly charts

Year-end charts

Certifications and sales

 

|}

Release history

References

1998 debut albums
Mýa albums
Interscope Records albums
Albums recorded at Sigma Sound Studios